Symbol (often written as Σψμβολ in typeface) is one of the four standard fonts available on all PostScript-based printers, starting with Apple's original LaserWriter (1985). It contains a complete unaccented Greek alphabet (upper and lower case) and a selection of commonly used mathematical symbols. Insofar as it fits into any standard classification, it is a serif font designed in the style of Times New Roman.

Due to its non-standard character set, lack of diacritical characters, and type design inappropriate for continuous text, Symbol cannot easily be used for setting Greek language text, though it has been used for that purpose in the absence of proper Greek fonts. Its primary purpose is to typeset mathematical expressions.

There was also an earlier Symbol designed in 1933 by Carl Albert Fahrenwaldt for Schriftguss Type Foundry.  It was a font of decorative initials based on his roman font Minister.

Encoding

The font was created by Adobe and has its own character encoding, with the Greek letters arranged according to similar Latin letters (Chi = C, etc.).  The document describing the mapping to Unicode code points was created before several of the characters were added to Unicode, so the original mapping assigns several of the characters to the Private Use Area (PUA). A newer mapping table for Apple's version of the font uses more recently introduced Unicode code points instead. The table below mostly follows the Apple mapping.

IBM calls the encoding Code page 1038, although the code page definition predates the addition of the euro sign, and uses 0xA0 for a numeric space character.

Beyond the use of Private Use Area code points, Adobe and Apple have a few other minor differences in code point assignments.  Character 0x27 (called "suchthat" in the Adobe document) is assigned by Adobe to U+220B (∋, CONTAINS AS MEMBER) but by Apple to U+220D (∍, SMALL CONTAINS AS MEMBER), which more closely resembles the symbol usually used for such that. Apple also introduces the Apple logo as PUA code point U+F8FF for character 0xF0, a position not used in the original Adobe font.

Lowercase Greek letters appear in italics in many older versions of Symbol.  While both Adobe and Apple agree on assigning characters 0x66 and 0x6A respectively to Unicode code points U+03C6 (φ, GREEK SMALL LETTER PHI) and U+03D5 (ϕ, GREEK PHI SYMBOL), some versions of the font interchange these two symbols.

Mapping of the angle bracket characters at 0xE1 and 0xF1 can vary. Adobe uses code points U+2329 and U+232A (〈 and 〉), whereas Apple uses U+3008 and U+3009 (〈 and 〉). The characters U+3008 and U+3009 are fullwidth punctuation, usually rendered with additional spacing so as to align them within em squares, as appropriate in East Asian typography. The characters U+2329 and U+232A, however, are canonically equivalent to U+3008 and U+3009, and are therefore changed to the latter under both NFC and NFKC Unicode normalisation. This equivalence is sometimes considered mistaken, but cannot be changed under the Unicode stability policy. For comparison, the fullwidth Latin characters in the Halfwidth and Fullwidth Forms block are mapped to their ASCII equivalents using compatibility mapping, not canonical equivalence, and therefore only changed by NFKC and NFKD normalisation. The alternatives U+27E8 and U+27E9 (⟨ and ⟩) are now preferred for mathematical use.

Font comparison

*encoded as ASCII for older versions of the font

HTML
The use of the Symbol font in mathematical expressions was part of a W3C recommendation for HTML 4.

At the time of that original recommendation (December 1997), the only native way to display many mathematical symbols in HTML was a direct use of the "Symbol" font. Such explicit references are now strongly discouraged for new documents, but they survive in many existing pages on the Internet. Also, the Symbol font provides graphics that are specifically intended as components in the two-dimensional layout of mathematical expressions. Examples include upper and lower parts of brackets or integral signs and a square-root sign without a vinculum.

Until 2010 or so, the Unicode glyph U+221A corresponding to the square-root sign (the HTML entity is named radic and has decimal code 8730) was usually rendered with a short built-in vinculum. That made it an inadequate graphical replacement for the original character from the Symbol font (itself designed around a slanted line extending all the way to the upper-right corner of the character box, without any spacing). The more recent renditions of the HTML radic entity (U+221A) no longer feature any vinculum and are thus more compatible with the standard graphical representation introduced in the Symbol font. Both styles of the square-root glyph (with or without a short vinculum) have the same disembodied meaning, so the integrity of the Unicode repertoire is not compromised by this adjustment.

Full legacy support of the Symbol font is provided by major modern web browsers like Internet Explorer and Google Chrome. That support involves a specific handling of Adobe's special encoding, which is not properly implemented in at least some versions of other browsers, including Opera, Safari and Firefox. Such browsers do not correctly render legacy HTML documents that make explicit use of the Symbol font.

See also
Aldo Novarese
DEC Technical Character Set
Lotus Multi-Byte Character Set (LMBCS)
MathTime

Notes

References

Further reading
 

Symbol typefaces
Typefaces and fonts introduced in 1985